which can be roughly translated as "book of manners", was a pre-modern Japanese literary genre, produced during the middle of the Edo period from the 1720's all the way to the end of the 18th century. Plots almost invariably took place in the Yoshiwara pleasure quarters, and usually revolved around the misadventures of two contrasting male archetypes, the "Tsu" or "sophisticate", and the Tanketsu or "one who only pretends at sophistication." The writing had a huge emphasis on humor and dialogue, without much in the way of actual dramatic or narrative plot elements. The booklets themselves containing anywhere from 60 to 100 pages.

Characteristics

"The  described the manners, language, and clothes of the men who frequented the licensed quarters and were adept in their ritualized etiquette." Often these men would attempt to flaunt their knowledge, only to be socially inept and ridiculed by the courtesans. There was a huge emphasis on conversational dialogue as opposed to formal speech forms common for literature at the time. In fact the stories are presented almost exclusively in natural dialogue cast in the vernacular of the Edo townsfolk. The  authors would incorporate the equivalent of our contractions, drawls, hesitation particles, and even ungrammatical utterances. The inclusion of such realistic dialogue is an innovation of the time.

As Araki later argues,  became the archetypal  story, where other writers would often compose their stories to fit within this structure.  combined dramatic dialogue with the satire of Edo-based  to create the form that typifies  as a genre.

However,  largely focused on the Half Tsu, satirizing his attempts at connoisseurship and emphasizing his inability to achieve this social and aesthetic ideal.

 were ostensibly about the physical world, and as such, there was plenty of product placement and references to real world places and people. The careful reader would be familiar with the references made to certain specific courtesans, even if their names were subtly changed, and many authors succeeded in making reference to real world products such as liquors, wines, food and clothing, endorsing the products themselves and effectively using  stories as advertisemenrs for their wares.

Developments
 existed between the 1720s and 1840s. This interval is commonly divided into three stages: early, middle and late.

Early period
The early period existed between the 1720s and the 1760s.

It establishes the traditional form and style of the genre. Another text published in the early period was : Buddha, Confucius, and Laozi all go to a brothel in Ōsaka.

Middle period

The middle period existed between the 1770s and the 1780s. During this time period, the genre reached its peak of popularity. Authors experimented with new locations, characters, and types of humor. It was at this time that  was codified as the basic model for future .

 : a man-about-town and a youth visit Yoshiwara. The man attempts to flaunt his knowledge of the latest fashions and trends, but is wrong and ridiculed by the courtesans. The youth turns out to be far more socially adept in the licensed quarters and receives better treatment. The Playboy Dialect serves as the archetypal , establishing the main beats of the genre: beginning with a description of the journey to Yoshiwara, a comparison between the half-baked or "pretender" Tsu with a true sophisticate, and the entirety of the story taking place over a day and a night. Almost all subsequent  would follow this pattern.

Late period
The late period existed between the 1790s and the 1840s. Santō Kyōden, "the leading writer of fiction at the end of the eighteenth century," wrote a number of important , which moved the genre away from describing the Tsu and half-Tsu dichotomy and focused more on the emotional consequences of the relationships formed between the male customers and female courtesans of the licensed quarters. This shift proved widely popular innovation for the genre and directly contributed to the  that would succeed it.

In 1790, the Kansei Reforms, led by Matsudaira Sadanobu, introduced strict censorship and penalties for "frivolous books". This had a significant impact on the  genre. Notable works included:

 

While the first three of these works saw immediate popularity following production, they also resulted in their author, Santō Kyōden, being confined to his home for fifty days in manacles as punishment for violating publication laws. While this marked the decline of the genre,  did not entirely cease directly after Kyōden's punishment – authors such as  had success in continuing the genre; however, these works were markedly different from earlier works. For example, Kokuga's , which argues that a courtesan's affection is more easily obtained by an ugly older man because "his feelings are deeper and purer," lacks the satirical mockery of connoisseurship that previously defined the genre and instead focuses on sentimentality, emotions, and sincerity.

References

Bibliography
 
 
 

Japanese literature
Edo-period works
Gesaku
Japanese words and phrases